Melt! Festival is one of the biggest open-air electronic music festivals in Germany. The festival takes place at the Ferropolis open-air museum, near Gräfenhainichen. It has been held since 1997.

Awards and mentions 
 #2 in Resident Advisor's Top 10 festivals for July 2013.
 #3 in Resident Advisor's Top 10 festivals for July 2014.
 #2 in Resident Advisor's Top 10 festivals for July 2015.
 Helga festival award, 2014, in the category "Most beautiful ones and zeros"
 Helga festival award, 2014, in the category "Best conscience"

Melt! Festival 2015

 A-Trak
 Alan Fitzpatrick
 Alt-J
 AnnenMayKantereit
 Aquilo
 Audion (Live)
 Aurora
 Autechre
 Bonobo (DJ-Set)
 Borrowed Identity
 Cakes da Killa
 Cashmere Cat
 Catfish and the Bottlemen
 Chris Liebing
 Claptone (Live)
 Clark
 Culoe de Song
 Damian Lazarus & The Ancient Moons
 Dark Sky
 David August (Live)
 Die Nerven
 Django Django
 Dorian Concept (Live) feat. Cid Rim and The Clonious
 Element of Crime
 Erlend Øye & The Rainbows
 Everything Everything
 Evian Christ (Live)
 Fickle Friends
 Flume (musician)
 Formatio
 Gengahr
 Giorgio Moroder
 Gorgon City (DJ-Set)
 Hercules and Love Affair
 Hot Since 82
 Howling
 Hudson Mohawke (Live)
 HVOB
 Ibeyi
 Jamie T
 Jamie xx
 Job Jobse
 Jon Hopkins
 Joy Wellboy
 Kaytranada

 Kink
 Kwabs
 Kylie Minogue
 L'Aupaire
 La Roux
 Lawrence
 London Grammar
 Malky
 Marek Hemmann
 Markus Kavka
 Mathias Kaden (Live)
 Max Graef & Kickflip Mike (Live)
 Modeselektor pres. Melt!Selektor
Mogwai
Nils Frahm
Nina Kraviz
Nozinja
Odesza
Pete Tong
 Pollyester
Ride
Romano
 Roni Size Reprazent (live)
 Rødhåd
Seinabo Sey
Shura
SiriusMode-selektor
Sizarr
Sophie
Soul Clap
Sven Väth
The Bug
Tiefschwarz (Live)
Tocotronic
Toro Y Moi
Tove Lo
Trevor Horn Band
TÜSN
Von Spar
Wanda
XXXY
Years & Years
Young Fathers
 Zenker Brothers

Line-ups, 2008–2014

2014: Portishead, Röyksopp & Robyn, The Notwist, Moderat, Fritz Kalkbrenner, Metronomy, WhoMadeWho … 

2013: The Knife, Trentemøller, Woodkid, Babyshambles … 

2012: M83, Gossip, Whitest Boy Alive, Justice, Two Door Cinema Club, Modeselektor, Bloc Party, Caribou, The Bloody Beetroots … 

2011: Hurts, Pulp, Paul Kalkbrenner, Robyn, Boys Noize, Everything Everything …

2010: …

2009: Oasis, Bloc Party, Aphex Twin …

2008: Björk, Franz Ferdinand, Hot Chip …

See also
List of electronic music festivals

References

External links

Official site

Music festivals established in 1997
Electronic music festivals in Germany